Tropidosaura cottrelli, also known commonly as Cottrell's mountain lizard, is a species of lizard in the family Lacertidae. The species is native to southern Africa.

Etymology
The specific name, cottrelli, is in honor of South African ornithologist John Awdry Cottrell, who collected the holotype.

Geographic range
T. cottrelli is found in Lesotho and South Africa.

Habitat

Description
T. cottrelli is large for its genus.

Reproduction
T. cottrelli is oviparous. An adult female may lay as many as four eggs.

References

Further reading
Hewitt J (1925). "On some new species of Reptiles and Amphibians from South Africa". Records of the Albany Museum, Grahamstown 3 (4): 343–370. (Basutosaura cottrelli, new species, p. 356).

Tropidosaura
Reptiles described in 1925
Taxa named by John Hewitt (herpetologist)